Priit Juho Vesilind (born 4 January 1943) is an Estonian and American senior writer and photojournalist of National Geographic magazine and an author of nonfiction.

Early life and education
Vesilind was born in Tallinn. In 1944, when he was one and a half, his mother Aino took him and his brother Aarne and fled to Czechoslovakia. The family was fleeing the Soviet occupation of his homeland during World War II. Later, his father Paul Eduard Vesilind rejoined his wife and children and they spent the next five years after the war in displaced persons camps in Geislingen, West Germany. In 1949 the family emigrated to the United States of America. He spent his childhood in Beaver, a small town in Western Pennsylvania. He is a 1964 graduate of the liberal arts college of Colgate University, located in the town of Hamilton in Madison County, New York, earning a BA in English and then an MA in Communications Photography from Syracuse University.

Career
Prior to working for National Geographic, Vesilind served as a lieutenant in the United States Naval Reserve, stationed at the Naval Communications Station, Hawaii. He was a reporter and editor for the Atlanta Journal, the Syracuse Herald Tribune, and the Providence Journal. Vesilind's career at National Geographic spanned more than thirty years and he rose to the position of the magazine's Expedition's Editor and Senior Writer.

Vesilind currently works as a freelance editor, writer, and photographer and lives with his wife, Rima, in Manassas, Virginia, USA.

Awards
In 2004, Former Estonian President Lennart Meri presented Vesilind with the Order of the White Star, Third Class.

Published works
National Geographic on Assignment USA, Publisher: National Geographic Books (1997), 
Horse People, Publisher: Bökforlaget Max Ström, Stockholm (2003), 
Eestlane Igas Sadamas—An Estonian in every Port, Publisher: Kirjastus Varrak, Tallinn (2004), 
Lost Gold of the Republic: The Remarkable Quest for the Greatest Shipwreck Treasure of the Civil War Era, Publisher: Shipwreck Heritage Press (2004), 
Eesti Aastal 1979—Estonia in the Year 1979, Publisher: Kirjastus Varrak (2006), 
The Singing Revolution, Publisher: Varrak Publishers Ltd (2008), 
When the Noise Had Ended—Geislingen's DP Children Remember, Publisher: Lakeshore Press (2009), : Co-author Mai Maddisson

References

External links
Jane Wesman Public Relations
Priit Vesilind, The Baltic Nations. National Geographic Magazine Vol. 178, No.5;  November 1990
Priit Vesilind Return to Estonia. National Geographic Magazine, Vol. 157, No. 4, April 1980, pp. 485–511.
Interview with Priit Vesilind in journal "Loodus" 
Writer, editor has story to tell in museum display

1943 births
American non-fiction writers
Estonian emigrants to the United States
Living people
People from Tallinn
People from Manassas, Virginia
Estonian photojournalists
American photojournalists
Estonian non-fiction writers
Estonian World War II refugees
Journalists from Virginia
Colgate University alumni
Recipients of the Order of the White Star, 3rd Class
20th-century Estonian writers
21st-century Estonian writers